Saint-Paul-de-Montminy is a village of 849 people located in the Montmagny Regional County Municipality, Quebec. Geographically it is located in the Notre Dame Mountains, part of the Appalachian Mountains located in Canada. It was founded in 1862.

See also
 List of municipalities in Quebec

References

External links
 City website

Municipalities in Quebec
Incorporated places in Chaudière-Appalaches
1862 establishments in Canada